The knockout stage of the 2014 Campeonato Paulista will begin on 26 March with the quarter-final and will be concluded on 13 April 2014 with the final. A total of eight teams compete in the knockout stage.

Round and draw dates
All draws held at Federação Paulista de Futebol headquarters in São Paulo, Brazil.

Format
Each tie, apart from the final are played over two legs, and the team with the best campaign playing at home. The quarterfinals are played between the winners and runners-up of each group. In the semifinals the best team (first) will face the team with the worst campaign (fourth), while the second will face the team with the third best campaign.

Qualified teams

Bracket

Quarterfinals

|}

Semifinals

|}

Finals

|}

References

Campeonato Paulista seasons